Group C of the 1993 Federation Cup Europe/Africa Zone was one of five pools in the Europe/Africa zone of the 1993 Federation Cup. Four teams competed in a round robin competition, with the top two teams advancing to the play-offs.

Great Britain vs. Luxembourg

Russia vs. Ukraine

Great Britain vs. Lithuania

Luxembourg vs. Ukraine

Great Britain vs. Russia

Luxembourg vs. Lithuania

Great Britain vs. Ukraine

Russia vs. Lithuania

Russia vs. Luxembourg

Ukraine vs. Lithuania

See also
Fed Cup structure

References

External links
 Fed Cup website

1993 Federation Cup Europe/Africa Zone